Cargomatic is a logistics company founded in 2013 by Brett Parker & Jonathan Kessler, based in Long Beach, California specifically targeting the fragmented short-haul and drayage trucking markets connecting shippers and carriers real-time with its crowdshipping web platform and mobile app.

Focus
The company focuses on assisting shippers and carriers in the trucking industry through the following segments:

Funding
In 2016, at the close of Series A funding, Cargomatic raised a total of $20.8M from investors including Morado Ventures, Canaan Partners, Sherpa Capital, and SV Angel. In 2018, Cargomatic raised $35M in its Series B funding from Warburg Pincus, Canaan Partners and Genesee & Wyoming.

References

Companies based in Los Angeles